Floris Adriaan van Hall, Baron of Hall (15 May 1791 – 29 March 1866) was a prominent Dutch nobleman and statesman in the 19th century. He played an important role as representative of the Amsterdam trade and banking sector, and later as politician. He served as Prime Minister of the Netherlands from 1853 to 1856, and again from 1860 to 1861.

Family
Van Hall was born in Amsterdam, on 15 May 1791. After the death of his mother, his father had ten more children with her niece Christina Maria. His father was Maurits Cornelis van Hall, who seated in the First Chamber of the States General and the Representative Body of the Batavian Republic from 1798 to 1801. He later seated in the States of Holland and in the First Chamber of the States General.

Van Hall was the oldest of six children. He married Alida Paulina (Pauline) Bondt in Amsterdam on 7 July 1815, but she died in 1845. On 30 July 1853, at the age of 62, Van Hall entered a second marriage with Henriëtte Marie Jeanne, Baroness Schimmelpenninck van der Oye. Both marriages remained childless.

Career
Van Hall received primary education from a Walloon preacher in Voorburg, after which he attended a Latin school in Amsterdam. From 1808 to 1811, Van Hall attended the Athenaeum Illustre, and, like his father, studied Roman and Contemporary Law at the Leiden University from 7 November 1811 to 22 January 1812.

After he had graduated, he became a lawyer in his father's firm in Amsterdam, where he was primarily concerned with protecting the interests of trading houses and shipping companies. On 3 July 1832, he succeeded his father in the States of Holland for Meerkerk. After the province's split in 1840, he seated the States of North Holland for Amsterdam. On 1 April 1842, King William II appointed him as the successor to Cornelis Felix van Maanen as Minister of Justice, and on 22 September 1843 as Minister of Finance. From 13 February 1849, he seated in the Second Chamber of the States General for the district of Amsterdam, until he succeeded Johan Rudolf Thorbecke as chairman of Council of Ministers in 1853. On 1 April 1856, King William II gave him the title of Baron, as a token of appreciation for his actions as minister of Foreign Affairs in the Crimean War, where he managed to uphold Dutch neutrality. In 1860 he became chairman of the Council of Ministers once again. He rejected an offer for the appointment to Governor-General of the Dutch East-Indies. He died in The Hague, on 29 March 1866.

Honours 
 Knight Grand Cross in the Order of the Netherlands Lion.
 Grand Cordon in the Order of Leopold.
 Grand Cross in the Order of the White Falcon

References
 
 

Specific

Further reading
 : Mr. F.A. van Hall als minister, 1904.
 : De Nederlandse ministers van Buitenlandse Zaken 1813-1900.

|-

|-

|-

|-

|-

|-

|-

|-

1791 births
1866 deaths
Barons of the Netherlands
Prime Ministers of the Netherlands
Ministers of Foreign Affairs of the Netherlands
Ministers of Justice of the Netherlands
Ministers of Religious Affairs of the Netherlands
Ministers of State (Netherlands)
Independent politicians in the Netherlands
Dutch members of the Dutch Reformed Church
Members of the House of Representatives (Netherlands)
Nobility from Amsterdam
University of Amsterdam alumni
Leiden University alumni
Politicians from Amsterdam